Bimal Bharali is a former Indian cricketer. He played 27 first-class matches for Assam and four for East Zone from 1969 to 1981. He captained Assam in most of their matches from 1976 to 1981.

A middle-order batsman, Bharali's highest score was 141 in a Ranji Trophy match against Orissa in 1976–77. His other first-class century was also against Orissa, in 1980–81, when he went to the wicket at 40 for 3 and scored 119 out of a team total of 245. In 1976–77, playing for East Zone against the touring MCC, he saved the match almost single-handed by batting for almost the entire 54-over second innings and finishing on 45 not out.

He served as a selector for Assam for some years before resigning in protest in 2005 when the Assam Cricket Association failed to comply with its own regulations when appointing a coach.

References

External links
 

Year of birth missing (living people)
Living people
Indian cricketers
Assam cricketers
East Zone cricketers
Cricketers from Guwahati